Les Adjots is a commune in the Charente department in the Nouvelle-Aquitaine region of southwestern France.

The inhabitants of the commune are known as Adjotois or Adjotoises

Geography

Location and access
Les Adjots is a commune located in the north of the department of Charente. It borders both neighbouring departments of Deux-Sèvres (northwest) and Vienne (north-east). It is located some 65 km south of Poitiers and 60 km north of Angoulême.

Traversed by the N10 west of the village running from north to south and by the parallel railway line along the eastern border of the commune, Les Adjots was on the road from Paris to Bordeaux as shown on plate 28 in the Atlas of Trudaine.

The departmental roads D911 passes through the commune close to the N10 from the north and continues south to Ruffec. The D176 also runs from the village south-east to Taize-Aizie and the D305 runs west to La Paiziere.

The railway line Paris-Austerlitz to Bordeaux Saint-Jean passes through the eastern boundary of the commune. Ruffec is the nearest station.

Hamlets and localities
Northwest of the town of Adjots, Chez Branger is the largest hamlet in the commune. It is located on the former N10. North of the town there are Chez Chagnaud and Chez Machet and to the south La Cour, Les Robins, and Les Loges. In the south-west the hamlet of La Batarderie is separated from the rest of the commune by the N10.

Neighbouring communes and villages

Geology and terrain
Geologically, the commune is located on Jurassic limestone of the Aquitaine Basin as is all of North-Charente. The Bathonian age appears on a small area east of the town, but the plateau is covered by alterite in the form of red flinty clay and locally by Oolite of iron south of the town.

The relief of the commune is that of a plateau with an average altitude of 140m. The highest point of the commune is at an altitude of 168m located on the north-western boundary. The lowest point is 120m located on the south-eastern boundary (Bois de Vallons). Due to the nature of the karst soil there are also some depressions and sinkholes. The village is 127m above sea level.

Hydrography
The town is located in the basin of the Charente but it has no watercourses or lakes.

Climate
As in three-quarters south and west of the department, the climate is oceanic Aquitaine, slightly degraded in the north of the department near the Seuil du Poitou.

Vegetation
The territory is composed of 69% of agricultural land, 27% forests and semi-natural areas, and 4% of artificial areas.

Toponymy
Attested in the Latinized form De Adjotis meaning "The gorse" in 1280

The current spelling is explained by the medieval romanization of the old French word ajou (13th century) ajonc which actually dates back to the pre-Latin *ajaugone giving *ajon ( of where ajonc. It is spelt with a final C by analogy with jonc, from the Latin juncus) giving ajou.

There are at least two dialects in the region ajaillon and jogue (feminine form from *ajauga) more to the south.

Administration
Created in 1793, Les Adjots passed from the arrondissement of Angoulême to the arrondissement of Confolens on 1 January 2008.

List of Successive Mayors of Les Adjots

Demography
In 2017 the commune had 525 inhabitants. After losing 45% of its population from 1851 to 1921 Les Adjots stabilized its population between 390 and 530 inhabitants.

Distribution of Age Groups

Percentage Distribution of Age Groups in Les Adjots and Charente Department in 2017

Source: INSEE

Economy
Les Adjots is an agricultural commune with a few artisans, backhoe services, masons, and a painter.

In the village there is a grocery store.

Facilities

Education
The school is an inter-communal teaching group between Les Adjots and Taizé-Aizie with each hosting an elementary school.

Medico-social
The IME Marc Signac is at La Tour.

Other services
Other services are found in Ruffec 8.5 km south.

Life in Adjots

Sport
The football club is a union between Taizé-Aizie and Les Adjots.

Communal and Employers Festival
The communal festival is at Easter and the employers festival on the first Sunday after 14 July.

Sites and Monuments

The Church, a parish of the former diocese of Poitiers, dates from the 12th and 13th centuries and was restored in the 19th century.
The Pavillon Tower dates from the 17th century.

Notable People linked to the commune
Auguste Merle (1855-1940), mayor of Saint-Junien, President of the Chamber of Notaries.

See also
Communes of the Charente department

References

External links
Les Adjots on the old National Geographic Institute website 
Les Adjots on Géoportail, National Geographic Institute (IGN) website 
Les Adjots on the 1750 Cassini Map

Communes of Charente